Barry Island Railway may refer to:

 Barry Tourist Railway 
 Vale of Glamorgan Railway